Halban is a village in Nakhal, Al Batinah South Governorate, in northeastern Oman. Halban is the home of the German University of Technology in Oman (GUtech) and Arab Open University in Oman (AOU-Oman).

References

Populated places in the Muscat Governorate